Satisfied Mind is the debut studio album by American country music singer Porter Wagoner. It was released by RCA Victor on February 4, 1957.

Critical reception
In the issue dated February 16, 1957, Billboard published a review of the album, which read, "Altho Porter Wagoner has not come thru with any smash singles lately, he is certainly one of the steadiest standard artists in the C&W field and dealers should find this package a profitable item. Wagoner's TV show will help move this also. The recordings are excellent. They are in the traditional style, are very tastefully arranged, and include songs with which Wagoner has scored, such as "Company's Comin'", "Tricks of the Trade", and "A Satisfied Mind"."

Commercial performance
The album did not appear on any major charts.

The album's first single, "Company's Comin'", was released in September 1954 and peaked at No. 7 on the US Billboard Country Singles chart. The second single, "A Satisfied Mind" was released in May 1955 and peaked at No. 1.

Track listing

References

1957 albums